†Harmogenanina linophora was a species of air-breathing land snails or semi-slugs, terrestrial pulmonate gastropod mollusks in the family Helicarionidae.

This species was endemic to Mauritius and Réunion. It is now extinct.

References

Harmogenanina
Extinct gastropods
Gastropods described in 1860
Taxonomy articles created by Polbot